Covão Grande is a settlement in the central part of the island of Santiago, Cape Verde. It is part of the municipality São Salvador do Mundo. In 2010 its population was 478. It is situated 2 km northwest of Picos and 2.5 km east of Assomada.

References

São Salvador do Mundo, Cape Verde
Villages and settlements in Santiago, Cape Verde